Kopernik is a non-profit organization headquartered in Indonesia that finds what works to reduce poverty in the last mile. In the US, it is a registered 501(c) organization.

History
Kopernik was co-founded by Toshihiro (Toshi) Nakamura and Ewa Wojkowska. Both had worked for the United Nations – Nakamura in Timor-Leste, Indonesia, Sierra Leone and the US and Wojkowska in Timor-Leste, Indonesia, Sierra Leone, Thailand and New York.

The organization is named for the astronomer Mikołaj Kopernik.

Description

The organization consists of four legal entities: Kopernik Solutions, Yayasan Kopernik, PT Kopernik, and Kopernik Japan.

Donations are distributed by local non-governmental organizations (NGOs). An NGO must be registered and submit an application to Kopernik that outlines its goals and distribution methods. Following approval, proposals are posted on the website and prospective donors may choose among them.
Experimentation Project focus on rapid experimentation of promising solutions to problems faced by people living in the last mile. These solutions may be technology driven (physical or information and communication technologies (ICT)) or approaches inspired by behavioral insights. The experimentation projects and data sets are generally small-scale, low-investment tests of promising ideas. 
Last Mile Consulting is a professional advisory service to corporate and public sector clients.
Technology Distribution provides a simple and affordable products that address the typical problems faced by people living in the last mile.

The distributed products include purified drinking water, solar lantern and other offered technologies include drip irrigation systems, grain storage, K-Honey filter and providing reusable menstrual pads for education on menstruation as well as sexual reproductive health.

Since September 2017, Kopernik responded  Emergency Response (ER), Mount Agung eruption, Lombok earthquake, Central Sulawesi earthquake, tsunami and liquefaction and Sunda Strait Tsunami. Kopernik distributed N95 respiratory masks and installed Fan-Filter Unit (FFU) for a haze-safe room in school in West Kalimantan.

The organization has received awards, including runner-up status in Crunchie's 2010 CleanTech category and a Gold-level transparency designation from the non-profit evaluation organization GuideStar. The United Nations Framework Convention on Climate Change (UNFCCC) has chosen Kopernik's Ibu Inspirasi/Wonder Women initiative as a Momentum for Change 2014 Lighthouse Activity.

References

Crowdfunding
501(c)(3) organizations
Non-profit organizations based in Indonesia